The 2019 Jacksonville Dolphins football team represented Jacksonville University in the 2019 NCAA Division I FCS football season. They were led by fourth-year head coach Ian Shields and played their home games at D. B. Milne Field. They were members of the Pioneer Football League (PFL). On December 3, 2019, Jacksonville University announced the discontinuation of the football program, making 2019 the final season of Dolphins football.

Previous season
The Dolphins finished the 2018 season 2–8, 1–7 in PFL play to finish in last place.

Preseason

Preseason coaches' poll
The Pioneer League released their preseason coaches' poll on July 30, 2019. The Dolphins were picked to finish in eighth place.

Preseason All–PFL teams
The Dolphins had two players selected to the preseason all–PFL teams.

Offense

First team

Garnett Nicolas – FB

Jake Dempsey – OL

Schedule

Game summaries

at Richmond

at Presbyterian

Dartmouth

Ave Maria

at Dayton

Morehead State

Davidson

at Butler

Stetson

at Drake

at Marist

San Diego

References

Jacksonville
Jacksonville Dolphins football seasons
Jacksonville Dolphins football